Slane More  is a townland in County Westmeath, Ireland.

Slane More is one of 11 townlands of the civil parish of Dysart in the barony of Moyashel and Magheradernon in the Province of Leinster. The neighbouring townlands are:  Slane Beg to the north,
Ballyboy to the north–east, Walshestown North and Walshestown South to the east, Slanestown and Clondardis to the south and Parcellstown to the west.

In the 1911 census of Ireland there were 4 houses and 20 inhabitants in the townland.

References

External links
Map of Slane More at openstreetmap.org
Slane More at The IreAtlas Townland Data Base
Slane More at Townlands.ie
Slane More at the Placenames Database of Ireland

Townlands of County Westmeath